The Saskatchewan United Party (SUP) is a right-wing political party in the Canadian province of Saskatchewan. The party was formed in November 2022 by former Saskatchewan Party MLA Nadine Wilson, and has promoted centre-right and populist ideologies.

History
The party was registered with Elections Saskatchewan on November 30, 2022, with Nadine Wilson, MLA for Saskatchewan Rivers, becoming party leader and its first member in the Legislature. Wilson had previously resigned from the Saskatchewan Party caucus due to misrepresenting her COVID-19 vaccination status, and then sat as an independent member, before starting the Saskatchewan United Party. In social media posts, the newly-formed party promoted stances against mass immigration, COVID-19 lockdowns, and vaccine mandates. 

While promoted as a centre-right party, StarPhoenix columnist Phil Tank classified the party's stance against mass immigration as being in line with other right-wing populist movements, and noted Wilson's previous involvement in the anti-mandate group Unified Grassroots.

The party hosted an official launch event on February 28, 2023 in Saskatoon, at which it introduced its logo and policy agenda. The party's positions include protecting the agriculture, energy, and natural resource industries, opposing interference to provincial sovereignty by federal and foreign powers, gun rights, "efficiency and opportunity" and less bureaucracy in health care, removing "ideologies" from school curriculums, and increasing parental involvement in education.

Party leaders
† denotes acting or interim leader

Bold denotes position as Premier

Current Saskatchewan United Party MLAs

See also
 List of political parties in Saskatchewan
 Politics of Saskatchewan

References

External links
Official website

Political parties established in 2022